Provincial elections were  held in the Pakistani province of Sindh to elect the members of the 13th Provincial Assembly of Sindh on 25 July 2018, alongside nationwide general elections and three other provincial elections in Khyber Pakhtunkhwa, Balochistan and Punjab. The remaining two territories of Pakistan, AJK and Gilgit-Baltistan, were ineligible to vote due to their disputed status. .

Background
Following the 2013 elections, despite a significant drop in vote share, the left-wing Pakistan Peoples Party remained the largest party in the assembly and held a comfortable majority with 91 seats. They were followed by the secularist, Muhajir-centric, Muttahida Qaumi Movement, which repeated its 2008 exploits, by securing 51 seats. New additions into the assembly included Pakistan Tehreek-e-Insaf, a welfarist, anti-establishment party led by former cricketer Imran Khan, who emerged as the second largest party in Karachi and gained 4 seats. Meanwhile, Pakistan Muslim League (F), PPP's perennial rival in Interior Sindh, held 11 seats.

Following the elections for the slot of chief ministership, Pakistan Peoples Party was easily able to form a government in Sindh for the ninth time in its existence. Party veteran Qaim Ali Shah was elected in the role of provincial chief minister for the third time in his career, and remained at the position until 2016 when he stepped down and was replaced by Syed Murad Ali Shah.

MQM Splits
During this tenure, MQM ceased to exist as single party due to internal rifts in the wake of the party's leader, Altaf Hussain, giving a controversial speech in August, 2016. It split into MQM-Pakistan and MQM-London, the former in control of Farooq Sattar, while the latter managed by Hussain, who is in self-imposed exile in London since 1991.

Meanwhile, Mustafa Kamal's nascent Pak Sarzameen Party chipped away at MQM-P members. Kamal himself being a former MQM stalwart and erstwhile Mayor of Karachi, who formed the PSP on 23 March 2016.

Further still, in the lead up to 2018 Senate elections, the MQM-P faction saw another split - into Sattar's MQM-PIB and Aamir Khan's MQM-Bahadruabad. The reason for the split being grievances over the allotment of Senate tickets.

Rise of PTI in Karachi 
In Karachi, Pakistan Tehreek-e-Insaf was seen as a better alternative for the city because of increasing support and popularity of Imran Khan. In May 2018 PTI Chairman presented ten-point Karachi agenda which included holding direct mayoral elections and improving the education system, healthcare and hospitals, police, business and industry, power shortages, playgrounds and sporting facilities, environment, sewerage and the circular railway, this also attracted many people of Karachi to support PTI. 

Although PTI won only 3 Sindh Assembly Seats and one National Assembly Seat from Karachi but still emerged as the 2nd largest party in Karachi in terms of vote bank. Nearly 0.7 Million Karachi citizens voted for Pakistan Tehreek-e-Insaf.

Results

election postponed at ps-94 after the death of MQM-P incumbent

Division-wise results

District-wise results

References

2018 elections in Pakistan
2018